, also known as Harp of Burma, is a 1985 Japanese film directed by Kon Ichikawa. The film is a color remake of the 1956 black-and-white The Burmese Harp, which was also directed by Ichikawa.

Cast 
 Kiichi Nakai
 Kōji Ishizaka
 Nenji Kobayashi
 Jun Hamamura
 Atsushi Watanabe

Reception
The Burmese Harp was the number one Japanese film on the domestic market in 1985, earning ¥2.95 billion in distribution income. With an audience of 3.87 million people, it was then the second largest Japanese box office hit.

References

External links 
 
 
 

1985 films
Remakes of Japanese films
1980s Japanese-language films
Films directed by Kon Ichikawa
Burma Campaign films
Films with screenplays by Natto Wada
Films set in Myanmar
1980s Japanese films

ja:ビルマの竪琴#1985年版